The 2016–17 Western Carolina Catamounts men's basketball team represented Western Carolina University during the 2016–17 NCAA Division I men's basketball season. The Catamounts, led by 12th-year head coach Larry Hunter, played their home games at the Ramsey Center in Cullowhee, North Carolina as members of the Southern Conference. They finished the season 9–23, 4–14 in SoCon play to finish in a tie for eighth place. They lost in the first round of the SoCon tournament to The Citadel.

Previous season
The Catamounts finished the 2015–16 season 16–18, 10–8 in SoCon play to finish in a tie for fifth place. They defeated Wofford to advance to the Semifinals of the SoCon tournament where they lost to Chattanooga. They were invited to the College Basketball Invitational where they lost in the first round to Vermont.

Offseason

Player departures

Recruiting Class of 2016

Roster

Schedule and results

|-
!colspan=9 style=|Non-conference regular season

|-
!colspan=9 style=|  SoCon regular season

|-
!colspan=9 style="| SoCon tournament

References

Western Carolina Catamounts men's basketball seasons
Western Carolina
West
West